The women's tournament in the 2019 Rugby League World Cup 9s will be held at Bankwest Stadium in Sydney on 18 and 19 October 2019.

Group stage

Final

See also
 2019 Rugby League World Cup 9s – Men's tournament

References

Rugby League World Cup 9s
2019 in Australian rugby league
2019 in Australian women's sport
2019 in women's rugby league